Live 1992 may refer to:

Live 1992 (Stéphane Grappelli album)
Live 1992 (Shakespears Sister album)
Den Haag 30 October 1992 by The Wedding Present; see The Wedding Present discography
Mr. Big Live; see Mr. Big discography